The 2001 PGA Championship was the 83rd PGA Championship, held August 16–19 at the Atlanta Athletic Club in Duluth, Georgia, a suburb northeast of Atlanta. David Toms won his only major championship, one stroke ahead of runner-up Phil Mickelson.

Toms led after 54 holes on the Highlands Course, two strokes ahead of Mickelson. Paired together in the final group, they battled for the lead back-and-forth throughout the day, both in pursuit of their first major. Toms led by one stroke on the 72nd tee, but put his tee shot in the rough. Faced with a long second shot over water, he decided to lay up on the  par-4 and rely on his short game. Toms' third shot stopped  left of the pin, and he sank the putt to save par for the win. His 265 total set the record for the lowest score at a major championship.

Two-time defending champion Tiger Woods finished 14 strokes back at 279 (−1), tied for 29th place. No former champions finished in the top twenty.

It was the third major at the Highlands Course, which hosted the PGA Championship in 1981 and the U.S. Open in 1976. All three victors were from the Deep South of the United States. The PGA Championship returned to the course in 2011.

Course layout
Atlanta Athletic Club, Highlands Course

Source:

Lengths of the course for previous majors:
 , par 70 - 1981 PGA Championship
 , par 70 - 1976 U.S. Open

Round summaries

First round
Thursday, August 16, 2001

Source:

Second round
Friday, August 17, 2001

Source:

Third round
Saturday, August 18, 2001

Source:

Final round
Sunday, August 19, 2001

Source:

Scorecard
Final round

Cumulative tournament scores, relative to par

Source:

References

External links
PGA.com – 2001 PGA Championship
Coverage on the European Tour's official site

PGA Championship
Golf in Georgia (U.S. state)
Sports in Duluth, Georgia
PGA Championship
PGA Championship
PGA Championship
PGA Championship